A Mark IV Amphibian is an early model of British naval oxygen rebreather made by Siebe Gorman. It was arranged like a UBA, but its oxygen cylinder is smaller. It was so called because it could be used for diving, or as an industrial breathing set on land.

External links
http://www.therebreathersite.nl/Zuurstofrebreathers/English/amphibian_mark_iv.htm

Amphibian
Underwater breathing apparatus